This is a list of National Historic Sites in the province of New Brunswick.  There are 63 National Historic Sites designated in New Brunswick, as of 2018, eight of which are administered by Parks Canada (identified below by the beaver icon ).  The first National Historic Sites to be designated in New Brunswick were Fort Beauséjour – Fort Cumberland and Fort Gaspareaux in 1920.

Numerous National Historic Events also occurred across New Brunswick, and are identified at places associated with them, using the same style of federal plaque which marks National Historic Sites. Several National Historic Persons are commemorated throughout the province in the same way. The markers do not indicate which designation—a Site, Event, or Person—a subject has been given.

This list uses names designated by the national Historic Sites and Monuments Board, which may differ from other names for these sites.

National Historic Sites

See also

History of New Brunswick
List of historic places in New Brunswick
Heritage Conservation Act (New Brunswick)

References

 
New Brunswick